The Battle of Kompong Speu began on June 12, 1970 when the combined forces of the Army of the Republic of Vietnam (ARVN) and the Khmer National Armed Forces (FANK) fought to recapture the provincial capital of Kampong Speu. The town was captured by People's Army of Vietnam forces on 13 June but was retaken by ARVN/FANK forces on 16 June.

References

Conflicts in 1970
1970 in Cambodia
Military history of Cambodia
Battles and operations of the Vietnam War in 1970
Kompong Speu